Madison Common Council is a city council of the legislative branch of the government of the City of Madison in Wisconsin. The Madison Common Council consists of 20 Aldermen elected from 20 wards who serve two-year terms.  The Common Council considers ordinances and resolutions whose subject matter includes traffic codes, taxes and housing regulations, among other issues. The Council's presiding officer is the Mayor of Madison, who chairs meetings.   

*= Common Council President

^ = Former Common Council President

Salary
Council Members currently receive $12,692 a year in base salary, the Council Vice President receives $13,692, and the Council President receives $15,444.

Notable Former Members

 Tammy Baldwin
 Paul Soglin
 Lisa Subeck
 Samba Baldeh
 Susan J. M. Bauman
 Albert G. Schmedeman
 John B. Heim

References

External links 
 City of Madison Common Council
 City of Madison Common Council Aldermanic District Map

Madison CommonCouncil
City councils in the United States